Mycosubtilin is a natural lipopeptide with antifungal and hemolytic activities and isolated from Bacillus species. It belongs to the iturin lipopeptide family.

Definition 
Mycosubtilin is a natural lipopeptide. It is produced by the strains of Bacillus spp mainly by Bacillus subtilis. It was discovered due to its antifungal activities. It belongs to the family of iturin lipopeptides

Structure 
Mycosubtilin is a heptapeptide, cyclized in a ring with a β-amino fatty acid. The peptide sequence is composed of L-Asn-D-Tyr-D-Asn-L-Gln-L-Pro-D-Ser-L-Asn. The ramification of the β-amino fatty acid can be iso or anteiso . It could contain 16-17 carbon atom.

Biological activities 
Mycosubtilin has strong antifungal and hemolytic activities. It is active against fungi and yeasts such as Candida albicans, Candida tropicalis, Saccharomyces cerevisiae, Penicillium notatum, Fusarium oxysporum.
Its antibacterial activity is quite limited to bacteria such as Microccocus luteus.

References 

Colloidal chemistry
Antibiotics
Lipopeptides
Non-ionic surfactants